IKRAM Muda Football Club  is an amateur football club based in Kuala Lumpur, Malaysia. They currently play in the third-tier division in Malaysian football, the Malaysia M3 League.

History
The club was established in 30 March 2019.

In 2019, IKRAM Muda was playing in the 4th division of Malaysian football league. While in the Liga M4, the club showed great improvement in the 2019 season when they get Selangor Social Premier League runner-up, qualifying the association to play in the promotion "play-off" matches to the Liga M3. IKRAM Muda loss to KSR Sains in the final of the "play-off", winning promotion to the 2020 Malaysia M3 League.

Players

First-team squad

Management team

Club personnel
 Manager: Ahmad Taqiyuddin Shahriman
 Assistant Manager: 
 Head coach: Hamdan Ibrahim
 Assistant coach : Rajasparan a/l V. Naidu
 Coach : Mohd Fauzan Yunos
 Goalkeeping coach: 
 Fitness coach: 
 Fisio : Mohd Zakhwan Abu Bakar

Honours

League 
 Malaysia M4 League
Runners-up : 2019

 Selangor Social Premier League
Runners-up : 2019

References

External links
 Official Facebook Page
 Official Twitter Page

Malaysia M3 League
Football clubs in Malaysia
Association football clubs established in 2019